Bellenger may refer to:

Aidan Bellenger (born 1950), English Benedictine monk
Arthur Bellenger, alias of the fictional character Harold Finch in the TV series Person of Interest
Étienne Bellenger (fl. 1580–1584), French merchant
Frederick Bellenger (1894–1968), British surveyor, soldier and politician
Jacques Bellenger (born 1927), French Olympic cyclist
Joseph-Marie Bellenger (1788–1856), Catholic priest
Romain Bellenger (1894–1981), French road racing cyclist